Macotasa orientalis is a moth of the family Erebidae first described by George Hampson in 1905. It is found in Myanmar, China (Fujian, Yunnan), Vietnam, Thailand, Singapore and on Malacca, Sumatra and Borneo.

References

Moths described in 1905
Lithosiina